Listed below are the dates and results for the 1982 FIFA World Cup qualification rounds for the European zone (UEFA). For an overview of the qualification rounds, see the article 1982 FIFA World Cup qualification.

A total of 32 UEFA teams entered the qualifying competition. Moreover, Israel were also assigned to the European zone despite not being a UEFA member. The European zone was allocated 14 places (out of 24) in the final tournament. Spain, the hosts, qualified automatically, leaving 13 spots open for competition between 33 teams.

The 33 teams were divided into 7 groups. The teams would play against each other on a home-and-away basis. The number of teams and spots for each group were as follows:
Groups 1 to 6 had 5 teams each. The group winners and runners-up would qualify.
Group 7 had 3 teams. The group winner would qualify.

Draw
The draw for the qualifying groups took place in the Zürichhorn Casino in Zürich, Switzerland on 14 October 1979. During the draw procedure, the 33 entrants were drawn into the 7 qualifying groups from the five pots of seeds, which had been announced ten days prior. As Group 7 only featured 3 teams (one team from Pot A, one team from Pot C and one team from Pot E), only the group winner of this group would qualify.

Summary

Groups

Group 1

West Germany and Austria qualified.

Group 2

Belgium and France qualified.

Group 3

Soviet Union and Czechoslovakia qualified.

Group 4

Hungary and England qualified.

Group 5

Yugoslavia and Italy qualified.

Group 6

Scotland and Northern Ireland qualified.

Group 7

Poland qualified.

Goalscorers

9 goals

 Karl-Heinz Rummenigge

7 goals

 Klaus Fischer
 Zlatko Vujović

6 goals

 Frank Arnesen

5 goals

 Erwin Vandenbergh
 Michel Platini
 Dinos Kouis
 Włodzimierz Smolarek
 Oleg Blokhin
 Manfred Kaltz

4 goals

 Kurt Welzl
 Jan Ceulemans
 Georgi Slavkov
 Preben Elkjær
 László Kiss
 Ramaz Shengelia

3 goals

 Hans Krankl
 Walter Schachner
 Ján Kozák
 Zdeněk Nehoda
 Joachim Streich
 Paul Mariner
 Terry McDermott
 Bernard Lacombe
 Didier Six
 László Fazekas
 Gerry Daly
 Michael Robinson
 Frank Stapleton
 Benny Tabak
 Francesco Graziani
 Rui Jordão
 John Robertson
 Sergey Andreyev
 Claudio Sulser
 Ian Walsh
 Paul Breitner
 Pierre Littbarski
 Vahid Halilhodžić

2 goals

 Kurt Jara
 Herbert Prohaska
 Kostadin Kostadinov
 Petr Janečka
 Ladislav Vízek
 Rüdiger Schnuphase
 Trevor Brooking
 Tony Woodcock
 Jean-François Larios
 Gerard Soler
 Jacques Zimako
 Georgios Kostikos
 Thomas Mavros
 László Bálint
 Tibor Nyilasi
 Ásgeir Sigurvinsson
 Tony Grealish
 Mark Lawrenson
 Paul McGee
 Gidi Damti
 Roberto Bettega
 Fulvio Collovati
 Bruno Conti
 Arnold Mühren
 Kees Van Kooten
 Gerry Armstrong
 Åge Hareide
 Tom Lund
 Hallvar Thoresen
 Humberto Coelho
 Manuel Fernandes
 Anghel Iordănescu
 Yuri Gavrilov
 Khoren Oganesian
 Umberto Barberis
 Brian Flynn
 David Giles
 Leighton James
 Bernd Schuster
 Dragan Pantelić
 Vladimir Petrović
 Ivica Šurjak

1 goal

 Millan Baçi
 Sefedin Braho
 Ilir Përnaska
 Muhedin Targaj
 Gernot Jurtin
 Bruno Pezzey
 Albert Cluytens
 Alexandre Czerniatynski
 Gerard Plessers
 Plamen Markov
 Stoycho Mladenov
 Chavdar Tsvetkov
 Tsvetan Yonchev
 Andrey Zhelyazkov
 Sotiris Kaiafas
 Stefanos Lysandrou
 Nikos Pantziaras
 Fivos Vrachimis
 Verner Lička
 Antonín Panenka
 Rostislav Vojáček
 Lars Bastrup
 Søren Lerby
 Per Røntved
 Allan Simonsen
 Reinhard Häfner
 Jürgen Heun
 Andreas Krause
 Kevin Keegan
 Bryan Robson
 Leo Houtsonen
 Keijo Kousa
 Hannu Turunen
 Ari Valvee
 Bruno Bellone
 Bernard Genghini
 Dominique Rocheteau
 Nikos Anastopoulos
 Imre Garaba
 Sándor Müller
 Magnús Bergs
 Atli Eðvaldsson
 Janus Guðlaugsson
 Albert Guðmundsson
 Lárus Guðmundsson
 Pétur Ormslev
 Árni Sveinsson
 Teitur Þórðarson
 Chris Hughton
 Moshe Sinai
 Giancarlo Antognoni
 Antonio Cabrini
 Gaetano Scirea
 Alain Nurenberg
 Emanuel Fabri
 Ernest Spiteri-Gonzi
 Ruud Geels
 Hugo Hovenkamp
 John Metgod
 Dick Nanninga
 Cees Schapendonk
 Simon Tahamata
 Frans Thijssen
 Noel Brotherston
 Billy Hamilton
 Sammy McIlroy
 Jimmy Nicholl
 Vidar Davidsen
 Svein Mathisen
 Zbigniew Boniek
 Andrzej Buncol
 Dariusz Dziekanowski
 Andrzej Iwan
 Leszek Lipka
 Stefan Majewski
 Andrzej Szarmach
 Minervino Pietra
 Ilie Balaci
 Marcel Răducanu
 Aurel Ţicleanu
 Kenny Dalglish
 Joe Jordan
 David Provan
 Gordon Strachan
 Paul Sturrock
 John Wark
 Volodymyr Bezsonov
 Aleksandr Chivadze
 Vitaly Daraselia
 Anatoliy Demianenko
 Hasse Borg
 Bo Börjesson
 Thomas Larsson
 Tony Persson
 Sten-Ove Ramberg
 Jan Svensson
 Robert Lüthi
 Hans-Jörg Pfister
 Alfred Scheiwilder
 Gian Pietro Zappa
 Fatih Terim
 Alan Curtis
 Carl Harris
 Robbie James
 Hans-Peter Briegel
 Wolfgang Dremmler
 Felix Magath
 Ivan Buljan
 Jurica Jerković
 Predrag Pašić
 Edhem Šljivo
 Safet Sušić
 Zoran Vujović

1 own goal

 Bernd Krauss (playing against West Germany)
 Philippe Mahut (playing against Ireland)
 Þorsteinn Bjarnason (playing against Czechoslovakia)
 John Holland (playing against East Germany)
 Gabriel Mendes (playing against Sweden)
 Markus Tanner (playing against England)
 Dai Davies (playing against Czechoslovakia)

See also
1982 FIFA World Cup qualification (CONMEBOL)
1982 FIFA World Cup qualification (CONCACAF)
1982 FIFA World Cup qualification (CAF)
1982 FIFA World Cup qualification (AFC and OFC)

References

 
UEFA
FIFA World Cup qualification (UEFA)
1980–81 in European football
1981–82 in European football